Apenburg-Winterfeld is a municipality in the district Altmarkkreis Salzwedel, in Saxony-Anhalt, Germany. It was formed by the merger of the previously independent municipalities Apenburg, Winterfeld and Altensalzwedel, on 1 July 2009.

References

Altmarkkreis Salzwedel